Martin Vrablec (born 13 January 1992) is a Slovak football defender who last played for MFK Skalica.

Slovan Bratislava
He made his professional debut for the Slovan Bratislava senior side on 24 November 2012 in the Corgoň Liga match against AS Trenčín, coming on as an 88th-minute substitute for Igor Žofčák, in the 3–1 home win for the Slovan side.

External links
ŠK Slovan Bratislava profile

References

1992 births
Living people
Slovak footballers
Association football defenders
ŠK Slovan Bratislava players
ŠK Senec players
FC ViOn Zlaté Moravce players
MFK Skalica players
Slovak Super Liga players
Sportspeople from Malacky